The Nevada Lunatics were a minor league baseball team based in Nevada, Missouri. Preceded by the 1901 Nevada Reds, the Nevada teams played exclusively as members of the Missouri Valley League, winning the 1902 championship. Nevada teams hosted home minor league games at Centennial Park. The "Lunatics" nickname corresponded to Nevada serving as home to the Missouri State Hospital for the Insane in the era.

History
Nevada, Missouri first hosted minor league baseball in 1901. The Nevada Reds became founding members of the Independent level Missouri Valley League.

The Nevada team became the Nevada "Lunatics" in 1902. The team moniker of "Lunatics" reflected local industry, as Nevada was then home to the Missouri State Hospital for the Insane. The building was the largest building in Missouri when constructed in 1885. The Nevada State Hospital closed in 1991 and the majority of the complex was demolished in 1999.

The Missouri Valley League was designated as a Class D league in 1902 and the newly re-named Nevada Lunatics were the Missouri Valley League Champions. with a record of 86–38, the Lunatics finished 1st in the 1902 Missouri Valley League standings under Manager James Driscoll. The league had no playoffs. Nevada finished 2.5 games ahead of the 2nd place Springfield Reds (83–40), who were followed by the Fort Scott Giants (80–44), Sedalia Goldbugs (72–48), Joplin Miners (56–66), Coffeyville Indians/ Chanute Oilers (41–81), Jefferson City Convicts (40–85) and Iola Gasbags (34–90) in the final standings.

On August 10, 1902, the Nevada Lunatics and Jefferson City Convicts had a game that featured a double no-hitter. Both Jefferson City's  Jim Courtwright and  Eli Cates of Nevada pitched hit–less games in a 1–0 Jefferson City victory. The rare occurrence has never happened at the Major League level and has happened just 10 times at the minor league level.

The 1903 season was the final season for minor league baseball in Nevada, as the franchise relocated during the season. On July 16, 1903, the Nevada Lunatics moved from Nevada, Missouri to Webb City, Missouri. The franchise briefly continued play members of the Missouri Valley League, becoming the Webb City Goldbugs. However, the Webb City Goldbugs disbanded on July 19, 1903, after playing four games for Webb City. Nevada/Webb City had an overall record of 21–43 under manager A. B. Cockerill when the team folded.

Nevada, Missouri has not hosted another minor league team.

Beginning in 1985, Nevada has hosted the Nevada Griffons, who today play as members of the summer collegiate baseball MINK League.

The ballpark
Nevada minor league teams were noted to have played home games at Centennial Park. Centennial Park was located at North Centennial Boulevard & East Ashland Street, Nevada, Missouri. Today the site is still in use, referred to as Centennial Park Fairgrounds.

Timeline

Year–by–year records

Notable alumni

Eli Cates (1902)
Harry Cheek (1901–1902)
Nick Kahl (1902)
Bill Rapps (1902)
Mike Welday (1902)

See also
Nevada Lunatics players

References

Baseball teams established in 1902
Defunct minor league baseball teams
Professional baseball teams in Missouri
Baseball teams disestablished in 1903
Defunct baseball teams in Missouri
Defunct Missouri Valley League teams
Vernon County, Missouri